Ferenc Györgyei (29 November 1900 – 26 August 1970) was a Hungarian wrestler. He competed in the Greco-Roman middleweight event at the 1924 Summer Olympics.

References

External links
 

1900 births
1970 deaths
Olympic wrestlers of Hungary
Wrestlers at the 1924 Summer Olympics
Hungarian male sport wrestlers
Martial artists from Budapest
20th-century Hungarian people